Persuasion is a BBC Screen Two 1995 period drama film directed by Roger Michell and based on Jane Austen's 1817 novel of the same name. In her theatrical film debut, Amanda Root stars as protagonist Anne Elliot, while Ciarán Hinds plays her romantic interest, Captain Frederick Wentworth. The film is set in 19th-century England, eight years after Anne was persuaded by others to reject Wentworth's proposal of marriage. Persuasion follows the two as they become reacquainted with each other while supporting characters threaten to interfere.

The novel was adapted by Nick Dear, who considered the story more mature than Austen's other novels, characterising it as one of realism and truthfulness, particularly in telling the story of two people separated and then reunited. As Austen's style conveys Anne's thoughts internally, Dear and Root felt compelled to express the character's emotions using less dialogue. Michell avoided what he felt was the polished, artificial feel of other 19th-century depictions, and discouraged his actors from wearing make-up or appearing too hygienic. Costume designer Alexandra Byrne produced clothing that appeared "lived-in", which won her a BAFTA. Persuasion was shot in chronological order, allowing Root to portray more easily Anne's development from being downtrodden to happy and blossoming. It was filmed during a period of popularity for Austen's works.

Originally the BBC was the sole production company of Persuasion until it partnered with the American WGBH Boston and the French Millesime. This gave the production a larger budget and allowed it to be filmed at locations featured in the novel, including Lyme Regis and Bath. Persuasion originally aired on 16 April 1995, when it was broadcast on BBC Two. Sony Pictures Classics released the film in American cinemas on 27 September 1995, as Austen's increasing popularity became apparent to Hollywood. Persuasions cinematic release attracted the attention of film critics, and it received generally positive reviews, with many praising Root's performance. Film scholars have observed significant changes from the source material, as well as class and gender themes.

Plot 
The film opens by cross-cutting between scenes of a Royal Navy ship carrying Admiral Croft, and a carriage carrying Mr. Shepherd and his widowed daughter Mrs. Clay to Kellynch Hall. Shepherd and Clay are accosted by creditors due to the debts owed by the residence's owner, Sir Walter Elliot, while Croft discusses the end of the Napoleonic Wars with fellow officers of the navy. Sir Walter, a vain foppish baronet, is faced with financial ruin. Though Sir Walter initially opposes the idea, he eventually agrees temporarily to move to Bath while the Hall is let; the idea came from Shepherd, family friend Lady Russell, and Sir Walter's second daughter, the intelligent Anne Elliot.

Anne is visibly shaken upon learning that the new tenant of Kellynch Hall will be Admiral Croft, who is the brother-in-law of Captain Frederick Wentworth. Wentworth is the naval officer Anne was persuaded to reject in marriage eight years previously because of his uncertain prospects. Captain Wentworth has now become very wealthy from taking prize ships in the Napoleonic Wars and has returned to England, presumably to find a wife. Later, Anne expresses to Lady Russell her unhappiness at her once wealthy family's current predicament, and at her past decision to reject the captain's marriage proposal. Anne visits her younger sister Mary, a hypochondriac who has married into a local farming family, the Musgroves. Anne patiently listens to the various complaints confided in her by each of the Musgrove family; this includes Mary's husband Charles, sisters-in-law Louisa and Henrietta, and parents-in-law Mr. and Mrs. Musgrove.

Captain Wentworth comes to dine with the Musgroves, but Anne avoids going, volunteering to nurse Mary's injured son. The following morning at breakfast, Anne and Mary are met briefly by Wentworth, the first time he and Anne have seen each other since she rejected him. Anne later hears that Wentworth thought her so altered that he "would not have known [her] again". Louisa and Henrietta begin to pursue marriage with Wentworth, as the family is unaware of his and Anne's past relationship. Visibly hurt by Anne's refusal years before, Wentworth appears to court Louisa, much to Anne's chagrin. Wentworth is told by Louisa that Anne had refused Charles' offer of marriage - a refusal which the Musgroves believed to be at the instigation of Lady Russell. After that, Charles had instead proposed to Mary.

Anne, Wentworth, and the younger Musgroves go to Lyme Regis and visit two of Wentworth's old naval friends, Captain Harville and Captain Benwick. While there, Louisa rashly jumps off some high steps in the hopes Wentworth will catch her; he does not, and she sustains a head injury. Afterwards, Anne goes to Bath to stay with her father and sister. Sir Walter and his eldest daughter Elizabeth reveal they have repaired their relationship with a previously disreputable cousin, Mr. Elliot, the heir to the Elliot baronetcy and estate. Anne is introduced to him, and they realise that they briefly saw each other in Lyme. Much to Lady Russell's pleasure, Mr. Elliot begins pursuing Anne, who remains uncertain. Meanwhile, Louisa has recovered and become engaged to Captain Benwick. Wentworth arrives in Bath and encounters Anne on several occasions, though their conversations are brief.

Anne learns from an old friend, Mrs. Smith, that Mr. Elliot is bankrupt and only interested in marrying Anne to help ensure his inheritance from her father. Mr. Elliot also wishes to keep the baronet from marrying Mrs. Clay and fathering a male heir. After Wentworth overhears Anne talking about the constancy of a woman's love, he writes her a passionate letter revealing that he has never stopped loving her. Anne quickly finds him outside and the two kiss and walk off, arm in arm. That night at a party, Wentworth announces his engagement to Anne, much to her father's shock and both Lady Russell's and Mr. Elliot's visible consternation. The final scene shows Wentworth and Anne on a naval ship, happy to be together.

Cast 

 Amanda Root as Anne Elliot
 Ciarán Hinds as Captain Frederick Wentworth
 Susan Fleetwood as Lady Russell
 Corin Redgrave as Sir Walter Elliot
 Fiona Shaw as Mrs. Croft
 John Woodvine as Admiral Croft
 Phoebe Nicholls as Elizabeth Elliot
 Samuel West as Mr. Elliot
 Sophie Thompson as Mary Musgrove
 Judy Cornwell as Mrs. Musgrove
 Simon Russell Beale as Charles Musgrove
 Felicity Dean as Mrs. Clay
 Roger Hammond as Mr. Musgrove
 Emma Roberts as Louisa Musgrove
 Victoria Hamilton as Henrietta Musgrove
 Robert Glenister as Captain Harville
 Richard McCabe as Captain Benwick
 Helen Schlesinger as Mrs. Smith
 Jane Wood as Nurse Rooke
 David Collings as Mr. Shepherd
 Darlene Johnson as Lady Dalrymple
 Cinnamon Faye as Miss Carteret
 Isaac Maxwell-Hunt as Henry Hayter
 Roger Llewellyn as Sir Henry Willoughby
 Sally George as Mrs. Harville
 Rhys Alexander Brown as Baby of Anne and Frederick

Production

Conception and adaptation 

The filming of Persuasion coincided with a sudden resurgence of Jane Austen adaptations, as it was one of six such productions released during the mid-1990s. The media dubbed the phenomenon "Austenmania". While it was common for a successful adaptation to lead to the production of others, this surge in Austen's popularity involved many simultaneous projects—Persuasions production, for instance, coincided with the TV serial Pride and Prejudice and the feature film Sense and Sensibility. Despite the surge, film scholar Andrew Higson and others argue that there is little evidence that the various producers—who were employed by different companies—communicated when conceiving their adaptations.

The idea for a film version of the 1817 Austen novel Persuasion began with the English producer Fiona Finlay, who had wanted to create an adaptation for several years. The novel had last been adapted by ITV in a 1971 serial starring Ann Firbank. Finlay felt that the "very romantic" story was one "everyone can relate to. There's something very touching about long-lost love". She approached the writer Nick Dear about adapting it for television; Finlay had enjoyed his contributions to theatre, particularly his play about William Hogarth, The Art of Success. Dear first suggested they try one of Austen's other works—either Sense and Sensibility or Pride and Prejudice—but agreed to adapt Persuasion after reading it. Dear considered the novel—the author's last completed work—a more mature story than the others.

Dear later wrote that Persuasion was superficially "a love story in the Cinderella mould" but it was also one of "realism and truthfulness", particularly in telling the story of two people separated and then reunited. He spent two years working on a script, and found this task difficult for several reasons. First, he needed to find a structure that would be faithful to the novel. Second, his protagonist barely spoke for the first half, and "therefore can't motor the action along as a central character conventionally does". Adapting Austen's wit was another challenge; much could not be used "because it's almost all in the author's voice telling us about characters, with a certain wit or lightness that came from the characters themselves. It's a craft job, interpreting the novel for oneself and then finding a film language for it".

An experienced theatre and television serial director, Roger Michell was chosen to direct Persuasion, in what was to be his first feature film. As a young child, Michell had been an admirer of Austen's, which set him apart from his male classmates. "I was the only boy in my class who took Austen as a special paper", he said. His attraction to Persuasion was based on his belief that it was Austen's most emotional and poignant novel, as well as her most autobiographical.  He described the work as an "erotic love story which is full of sexual yearning". While directing, Michell sought to emphasise contrasts in Austen's story, seen for instance between "the chilly formality of Kellynch Hall and the warm, wet feel of Uppercross". The Royal Navy was another point of interest, as officers like Wentworth would often have returned to society wealthy and full of stories. The director wished to depict the integration of cultures, as naval officers came back with "an informality of behaviour and language which was in marked contrast to what was there before".

Casting 

Root made her theatrical film debut playing Anne Elliot, the film's protagonist. According to Root, "every actress in England" read for the part. Having worked with the director previously on the 1993 TV serial The Buddha of Suburbia, Root won the role by writing him a letter to gain an audition. The character was described to Root as "haggard", which attracted the actress. "I relish a job like this, starting off downtrodden and gradually blossoming", she said. WGBH Boston, the American company co-producing the film, had wanted a better-known actress for the part but agreed to Root's casting after seeing Root's screen test.

Root came to realise that while the novel's narrative style allowed Anne's thoughts to come through, the film adaptation offered comparatively little dialogue. As a result, she "had to cover pages and pages of the story without uttering anything, much of the time. I couldn't even think about technique, I just had to keep looking at the [novel] and then somehow radiate the feelings". Persuasion was shot in chronological order, which allowed Root to see "what a difference [her character's] sense of unhappiness can create", as by the end of the film Anne is "happier and looks better". Root considered the role to be much quieter than her experiences working with the Royal Shakespeare Company, which included her portrayal of Lady Macbeth. The Irish actor Ciarán Hinds, who depicted Frederick Wentworth, commented that Austen "understands a man's heart and how delicate it can be sometimes". He also appreciated that, though Wentworth was a "competent leader of men in his profession", he was "socially inept" in Anne's presence. Susan Fleetwood, the actress who played Lady Russell, had also worked with Michell on The Buddha of Suburbia. She died soon after filming; Persuasion was her last film role.

Make-up and costume design 

Michell attempted to be as faithful to the novel as possible, in particular avoiding what he felt was the polished, artificial feel of other period dramas set in the 19th century. The director explained, "I was desperately trying to make it feel like it could be happening in the next room. I tried to make it something which is absolutely about real people and not about dressing or hairstyles or carpet". Consequently, because he felt the realistic look of the age would make the film more dramatic, Michell chose to depict the actors without make-up and stopped them looking too hygienic. Root commented about the film's natural look in an interview, "I basically didn't wear any makeup [in the film], and my hair was obviously set in a very unflattering way... I suppose the lighting was quite harsh, as well. None of us looked good". She said in a separate interview, "I wanted to make Anne Elliot a somewhat plain woman who was not really miserable but had found a way to be content somehow, and yet emotions are buzzing around her all the time". Root believed the film's realistic depiction of the age was a key aspect of its appeal.

The film's costume design was overseen by Alexandra Byrne, who created clothing that appeared "lived-in" and "realistic". Like Fleetwood, Byrne had also worked with Michell on The Buddha of Suburbia. It was her first time designing period costumes for film. During shooting, the crew often had to compete for costumes and props with the BBC production Pride and Prejudice, which was being filmed at the same time. Persuasions crew consequently had to send for replacement items from Italy and Australia. For her work in the film, Byrne won a BAFTA for Best Costume Design.

Louise Watson, writing for Screenonline, felt the film's costume and make-up help "convey the full Cinderella transformation of Austen's heroine. At first the undervalued family martyr, Anne is the wallflower who has lost her 'bloom'. Her loose-fitting costumes hint at how she has pined away since refusing Wentworth... As she regains her confidence, she blossoms; she dresses becomingly, her eyes sparkle and her features become animated". Paulette Richards argues that the film's "unreliable" male characters, such as Sir Walter, are identified as such by the flamboyant nature of their clothing. This flamboyance is especially clear to modern viewers, who live in a culture where "real men" are expected to care little for their clothing. Conversely, Wentworth is typically depicted in the film wearing naval uniforms, which is a contrast to Bryan Marshall's version of the character in the 1971 adaptation. This uniform helps set Wentworth apart from many of the other male characters, allowing him to appear romantic but isolated. Gina and Andrew MacDonald had a similar view of the film, writing that it accurately captures Austen's satire by juxtaposing the upper classes' extravagance in fashion with the virtuous qualities of the Royal Navy. The naval men's profession is emphasised by the frequency of wearing their uniforms, in contrast to other adaptations of the novel.

Filming 

As a BBC production, Persuasion originally received a budget of £750,000. The British broadcaster proposed a collaboration with the American public television station WGBH Boston, a partnership that had also produced the American anthology television series Masterpiece Theatre as well as literary adaptations like the serial Pride and Prejudice. Rebecca Eaton, the executive producer of Masterpiece Theatre, approved the co-production as she had a preference for Persuasion out of all Austen's novels.  The decision led to additional funding. Eaton would cite Persuasion as a successful example of WGBH using its small budget to invest in television projects, though she later expressed regret that the adaptation was two hours rather than a "luscious" six-part miniseries. Additionally, the French company Millesime co-produced the film in exchange for airing it on television in France. This decision further increased funding to £1,000,000. Mobil Oil Corporation, a major sponsor of Masterpiece Theatre, co-produced the film.

The diverse sources of funding meant that the production team had to field opinions from various sources. Millesime was unhappy with certain aspects of the story, for instance wanting the entire Lyme sequence removed because they considered it "too boring". WGBH gave the BBC detailed notes, which were then integrated into the script. One change concerned the ending. To display the climax when Anne and Wentworth finally approach each other with their feelings, two different scenes were shot, one in which they kiss and one in which they do not. Dear first wrote a scene closely modelled after Austen's ending: Anne reunites with Wentworth on the streets of Bath, and the two exchange words and hold hands. Eaton felt that after hours of waiting, audiences "would go nuts with frustration and irritation" if the two did not kiss. Eaton also thought "a kiss would be an emotional pay-off", and WGBH believed it would give the film a wider appeal. Michell agreed to compromise, opting to shoot one British version and one American version—the latter included the kiss. The American ending is reflected on the international poster, which shows the two protagonists embracing. While the kiss attracted some criticism among fans, actress Amanda Root defended it. "After the great suspense of the story, by the end you're desperate for Anne and Captain Wentworth to get together, desperate! Film is a visual medium, after all. You don't necessarily want to see them in bed together, but you do want to see something like a kiss", she said.

In comparison to its adaptations of the 1970s and 1980s, the BBC provided increased funding for many of its productions in the 1990s. Persuasion consequently benefited, allowing it to frequently film on-location in places including Lyme Regis and Bath, and the south-eastern English countryside. Both Lyme and Bath are prominent locales in Austen's novel. Dear desired the opening sequence be on board a Royal Navy ship of the period, but the only authentic vessel available was Nelson's HMS Victory. It was dry-docked as part of a museum in Portsmouth, and filming was only possible during short periods when the vessel was closed to the public. The final shot, in which Anne and Wentworth gaze into the ocean, was taken from the 1984 historical film The Bounty. The film's low budget also resulted in one of the opening shots, depicting Admiral Croft's ship on the ocean, being taken from The Bounty.

Themes and analysis

Changes from source material 
While Dear has received praise for "remarkably... retain[ing] most of the source novel's complex plot and numerous characters", literary scholars have noted significant differences between the film and the source material. Sarah R. Morrison observes that the film's version of Anne articulates thoughts that the character would never say in the novel. Morrison cites Anne's adamant defence of her visit to Mrs. Smith—where Anne visits a poor old friend rather than go to the party of a titled relative—in the film as an example, as "Austen's narrator makes it abundantly clear that Anne would never presume to dispute with her father upon such terms of absolute equality". The film's Anne also engages in actions not visible in the novel, such as her haste to stop Wentworth from leaving a musical concert when he feels demeaned by disparaging comments about his profession. Morrison attributes these differences to the difficulty in adapting novel to film, particularly as the latter form lacks a narrator to convey Anne's inner thoughts.

The film also expands upon Austen's subtle characterisation by exaggerating the emotions of characters and certain scenes. For example, in the novel during an early party, Anne offers to play the pianoforte as usual; while doing so, she is slightly tearful but also "extremely glad to be employed" and "unobserved". Conversely, Dear's screenplay has Wentworth quickly giving up his seat to Anne and then immediately dancing with the Musgrove sisters, furthering the contrast between Anne and the others. According to David Monaghan, Austen's novel displays a "relatively radical vision" of societal change, such as the rise of a professional class challenging the old order of landed gentry. Monaghan posits that this vision appealed to Dear and Michell, who used visuals and movement to emphasise this change. However, the two "deviate significantly" from the source material by depicting Anne and Wentworth as "single-mindedly oriented" to the future and thus 20th-century viewers' sensibilities.

Sue Parrill observes that Persuasions larger production budget, which allowed the crew to film much content on location, "enabled the filmmakers to make fuller use of setting for symbolism and for creation of mood". The weather, for instance, is particularly important to Anne's state of mind in the novel. Persuasions opening scenes establish its historical context as well as the financial predicament in which the Elliot family finds itself. Indeed, for Rachel Brownstein, by opening the film with a depiction of sailors, the director is confronting a common complaint about Austen's works—her failure to mention the Napoleonic Wars. The juxtaposition between the navy and the Elliots establishes their differences, with the former group discussing the fall of Napoleon and the latter group discussing the relatively minor inconvenience of overspending.

Class and gender 

In his introduction to the published screenplay, Dear said he was in part attracted to adapt Persuasion because it depicted a "world in transition". To him, the novel showed "an old order fading away into decadence, and a new tribe, a meritocracy, coming to the fore". While directing, Roger Michell felt that the story included "the prototype of the postmodern family"—Anne's mother is dead, her father is bankrupt, and "the old social orders are breaking down". Root described Anne as a "feminist in a prefeminist period" and a "strong, independent character", to whom modern viewers can relate despite the story's period setting.

Austen scholars have studied the film's intersection with class and social change. Carole M. Dole notes that, among the many productions of Austen's work that appeared in the 1990s, Persuasion was the only one to "insistently draw attention to class issues", and "provide striking visual testimony to the workings of the British class system". The film, she adds, accomplishes this in part by focusing on the servants' faces, gauging their negative reactions to events. Richards, too, finds Michell "visually more aware" of the lower classes, adding that the film's inclusion of black servants alludes to the "colonial sources of wealth" supporting those superior in class and rank. Anne-Marie Scholz writes that the film and Emma Thompson's Sense and Sensibility both highlight the theme of class, but in different ways. Unlike Sense and Sensibility, Persuasion depicts general class divisions rather than just how the working class impacts the protagonists—the camera focuses on the faces and expressions of servants and working people, personifying them.

In Michell's opinion, Austen was a "proto-feminist" who possessed a "clear-sighted vision of the ways the world is tilted against women". As evidence, Michell cites a book scene in which Anne discusses how songs and proverbs about women's fickleness were all written by men. Scholz argues that Anne's marginal status as a woman in the film is linked to that of the servants; the parallel between class and gender is conveyed with Anne's trip to Uppercross in a cart containing animals. Julianne Pidduck adds that the director "pointedly foregrounds themes of class and gendered social constraint by juxtaposing the stuffy interiors of mannered society with the inviting, open horizons of the sea". As an example, Pidduck discusses Anne's stay in a gated residence in Bath, where she gazes out of an upper story window in search of Wentworth on the streets below. To her, Wentworth and the sea represent freedom and possibility.

Reception

Release 
Persuasion premiered on 16 April 1995, Easter Day, on the British television channel BBC Two. An estimated 3.8 million viewers watched the production. BBC Two aired it again on 25 December, Christmas Day. It also later aired on the American television channel PBS on 6 April 1997.

Near the end of filming, Rebecca Eaton noticed the growing "buzz" surrounding Austen and costume dramas in Hollywood. WGBH had never made a theatrical film before, but "decided to try its luck on the big screen". Sony Pictures Classics saw a cut of the adaptation and requested permission to show it in American cinemas, releasing it on 27 September 1995. There, it was characterised as an "art-house" film, with a small niche audience. It was shown at the Toronto and Chicago International Film Festivals. Persuasion earned $56,000 in its first week of release in New York and grossed $150,000 in Los Angeles. The total US gross was $5,269,757. The film also was given a limited cinema release in Australia, Germany, and France in 1996. It was less financially successful than the popular Sense and Sensibility, which was released in cinemas several months later. The film was released in VHS format on 12 November 1996; a DVD version followed on 1 February 2000.

Critical reception 

Persuasion at first failed to attract many reviews. This changed when Pride and Prejudice and Sense and Sensibility were released in late 1995 to great success in the UK. Their reception lifted the earlier film out of obscurity, as Austen's popularity became apparent among critics. Persuasion garnered highly positive reviews from major film critics, and the review aggregation website Rotten Tomatoes has since calculated a rating of 86%, which refers to the percentage of positive reviews. Caryn James of The New York Times deemed it a "critic's pick", praising "a cast completely in sync with Austen's warm but piercing style". Jay Carr of The Boston Globe highlighted Root's performance, calling it "a heart-stoppingly reticent yet glorious debut".

In a contribution for The Washington Post, Desson Howe said "there's a wonderful, unhurried delicacy about Persuasion...as if everyone concerned with the production knows that, if given time and patience, Austen's genius will emerge. Thanks to assured performances, exacting direction and, of course, inspired writing, it does, in subtle, glorious ways". Writing for Entertainment Weekly, critic Ken Tucker graded the film with an "A−", saying it "should enthrall even those who haven't read" the novel. Tucker concluded that the film was "the sort of passionate yet precise comedy that reminds me why Austen remains such a vital writer". Susan Ostrov Weisser, a professor of nineteenth-century literature, called the film a "faithful parade of Austen's world", and praised Root as the film's "crown jewel" for playing a "fiercely intelligent, regretful, and frustrated Anne Elliot with subtlety and nuance". In 2008, James Rampton of The Independent rated it the fourth-best Austen adaptation of all time.

When reviewing, film critics often compared the respective adaptations of Persuasion and Sense and Sensibility. Thompson's film received more recognition and accolades from Hollywood, while Michell's production gained the admiration of up-market critics, who felt it was a more authentic and thoughtful representation of Austen's world. Janet Maslin of The New York Times, for instance, wrote that Sense and Sensibility "can't match the brilliant incisiveness of the more spartan Persuasion, still the most thoughtful new Austen adaptation". The Los Angeles Times characterised Persuasion as "the most authentically British version and the one closest to the spirit of the novels" and Sense and Sensibility as "the audience-friendly Hollywood version of Austen, easygoing and aiming to please". Time magazine named them both the best films of 1995, referring to Persuasion as "reserved" and Sense and Sensibility as "more bustling". Higson, when analysing both productions, felt Persuasion captured a sense of "gritty realism" that would influence such later Austen adaptations as Mansfield Park (1999) and Becoming Jane (2007).

Accolades

See also 

 1995 in film
 Jane Austen in popular culture
 Styles and themes of Jane Austen
 Screen Two

References

Works cited

External links 
 Official website at Sony Pictures Classics
 
 
 

1995 television films
1995 films
British romantic drama films
American romantic drama films
Films based on Persuasion (novel)
Films directed by Roger Michell
Films set in country houses
Television shows based on works by Jane Austen
Napoleonic Wars films
Films about hypochondriasis
American drama television films
1990s English-language films
1990s American films
Sony Pictures Classics films
1990s British films
British drama television films